Simone Barrientos (born 5 October 1963) is a German politician. Born in Eisleben, Saxony-Anhalt, she represents The Left. Simone Barrientos has served as a member of the Bundestag from the state of Bavaria from 2017 until 2021.

Life 
Barrientos grew up in Neustrelitz as the child of a single mother who was a dancer with the folklore ensemble of the GDR and the Friedrich-Wolf-Theater in Neustrelitz. She was also looked after in state nurseries and in a Catholic children's home. After attending school, she first learned the profession of an industrial electrician at the Deutsche Reichsbahn. At the age of 17 she gave birth to a son whose father had left for the "West". She completed a further apprenticeship as a commercial advertiser. After the fall of the Berlin Wall in the GDR, she worked in various sectors until 2008: as a draftswoman, interpreter, in a casting office and in film production. From 2008 to 2017, she managed the publishing house Kulturmaschinen as a publisher. She became member of the bundestag after the 2017 German federal election. She is a member of the Committee for Culture and Media. She is spokesperson for cultural policy for her parliamentary group.

References

External links 

  
 Bundestag biography 

1963 births
Living people
Members of the Bundestag for Bavaria
Female members of the Bundestag
21st-century German women politicians
Members of the Bundestag 2017–2021
People from Eisleben
Members of the Bundestag for The Left